Lottery Ticket is a 1970 Indian Malayalam-language film, directed by A. B. Raj and produced by T. E. Vasudevan who also wrote the story under the alias V. Devan. The film stars Prem Nazir, Sheela, Adoor Bhasi and Jose Prakash. It was released on 28 November 1970.

Plot

Cast 

Prem Nazir as Venugopal
Sheela as Malathi
Adoor Bhasi as Lottery Menon
Jose Prakash as inspector
Muthukulam Raghavan Pillai
Sankaradi as Appukuttan
Sreelatha Namboothiri as Janamma (Lottery Menon's Wife)
Paul Vengola as Rajappan
G. K. Pillai as Inspector
K. P. Ummer as S.R Menon
Meena  as Rajamma's Mother
Paravoor Bharathan as Rajamma's Father
N.Govindankutty as Madhavankutty
Sadhana as Rajamma
Thodupuzha Radhakrishnan as Rival Lottery Agent

Soundtrack 
The music was composed by V. Dakshinamoorthy and the lyrics were written by Sreekumaran Thampi.

References

External links 
 

1970 films
1970s Malayalam-language films